Bolgenach is a river of Bavaria, Germany and Vorarlberg, Austria. It flows into the Weißach near Krumbach.

See also
List of rivers of Bavaria

References

Rivers of Bavaria
Rivers of Vorarlberg
Rivers of Austria
Rivers of Germany
International rivers of Europe